Claudia Christian (born Claudia Ann Coghlan, August 10, 1965) is an American actress, singer and author, known for her roles as Commander Susan Ivanova on Babylon 5, as Captain Maynard on Fox's 9-1-1, and as the voice of Hera on the Netflix series Blood of Zeus. She is also the voice of Helga Sinclair in Atlantis: The Lost Empire.  She is the founder and CEO of the C Three Foundation, a proponent of the medication based Sinclair Method for treating alcohol dependence.

Early life
Christian was born in Glendale, California, the only daughter of Hildegard (née Christian), who worked as the director of Giorgio Beverly Hills, and James Michael Coghlan. Her mother is from Germany and her father has Irish ancestry. Christian and her three elder brothers were raised in Connecticut. Her eldest brother was killed by a drunk driver while the family lived in Houston, Texas, and the family moved to California when she was 14. She changed her name by deed poll from Coghlan to Christian and moved to Hollywood to begin her acting career.

Career
Her first screen appearance was in an under-five role on Dallas. Further work included television guest appearances on Falcon Crest, Quantum Leap, Matlock, Murder, She Wrote, L.A. Law, and It's Garry Shandling's Show, and as a series regular on Berrenger's.

She also appeared in TV movies Lies of the Twins with Isabella Rossellini, Calendar Girl Murders with Sharon Stone, A Masterpiece of Murder with Bob Hope and Don Ameche, Kaleidoscope with Jaclyn Smith and Coleen Dewhurst, and as Faye Dunaway's daughter in Columbo: It's All in the Game.

Christian's film career launched with Clean and Sober opposite Morgan Freeman and Michael Keaton, Never on Tuesday with Andrew Lauer and Peter Berg, The Hidden with Kyle MacLachlan, 20th Century Fox's The Chase with Charlie Sheen, the Columbia comedy Hexed, and Adam Rifkin's The Dark Backward.

From 1994 to 1998, Christian appeared as Commander Susan Ivanova on Babylon 5. She left the science fiction series when contract negotiations for the fifth and final season broke down. Series creator J. Michael Straczynski maintains that she chose to leave of her own accord, while Christian avers that she wished to return for the final season but was released when she requested a reduction in the number of episodes in which she would appear so she could complete another project. Christian did appear in the series finale, reprised her role in Babylon 5: In the Beginning and Babylon 5: Thirdspace, collaborated with cast members on the album The Be Five, and conceived her own interactive fan convention, Claudia Con UK, which took place in the UK.

Christian posed for a nude pictorial in the October 1999 issue of Playboy.

Following the success of Babylon 5, Christian's guest starred on series including Highlander: The Series, Judd Apatow's Freaks and Geeks, NYPD Blue, Everwood, Nip/Tuck, Grimm, Criminal Minds, Castle, The Mentalist, and NCIS, and voiced the role of Helga in Atlantis: The Lost Empire. In 2004, she returned to Laguna Beach, California, where she attended high school, to star in the American premiere of Michael Weller's play What the Night Is For with Kip Gilman and directed by Richard Stein.  She also starred in the British series Starhyke, on Showtime's Look, and in the BBC comedy series Broken News. In addition, Christian played Janine Foster in the Doctor Who audio drama The Reaping and appeared in the films The Garden with Lance Henriksen and Half Past Dead with Steven Seagal.

As of 2020, Christian appears as Captain Elaine Maynard on the Fox series 9-1-1 and as the voice of the goddess Hera in the Netflix series Blood of Zeus. She also plays the title role in the Anne Manx radio series and voices characters in major video games including Call of Duty: Infinite Warfare, The Elder Scrolls V: Skyrim, Fallout 4, and Pizza Morgana.

Author
Christian is the author of both fiction and non fiction books. Her non fiction works include her initial memoir, My Life with Geeks and Freaks, her updated autobiography Babylon Confidential: A Memoir of Love, Sex, and Addiction, Journeys: Inspirational Stories of Recovery from Alcohol Addiction Using a Breakthrough Scientific Method and a cook book co-authored (with Mark Michel), Snack Hacks. She also wrote the introduction for the 2nd edition of The Cure for Alcoholism: The Medically Proven Way to Eliminate Alcohol Addiction. 

Her fictional works are The Misadventures of Miss Emma Bradford (aka Emma Bradford and the Mystery of Queen Tut), Wolf's Empire: Gladiator, and The Original: The Trials of Sara Larkin,

Together with Chris McAuley, Christian has also created Dark Legacies, a Science Fiction universe. The first of the multimedia projects is a comic book thriller, funded on Kickstarter.

Advocate
Christian is an advocate of The Sinclair Method (TSM), a medication-based method for treating alcohol dependence. TSM involves the targeted use of Naltrexone. She credits TSM with saving her life in 2009. To increase awareness of this treatment, she collaborated with Morgan Grant Buchanan to write a book, Babylon Confidential, and made a documentary, One Little Pill, about the science behind this method. In 2013, she founded the 501(c)3 non-profit C Three Foundation to educate medical professionals and people suffering from alcohol dependence about the success of TSM. She has spread the word through her TEDx talk on the subject, podcast appearances, contributions to magazine articles, and her television, newspaper and magazine interviews.  She has also testified before the U.S. Senate on harm reduction.

Filmography

Film

Television series

Video games

Writing
 "Revenge is a Bitch to Swallow", short-story, published in Forbidden Love Issue 2: Wicked Women
 My Life with Geeks and Freaks, autobiography, published by Yard Dog Press
 Babylon Confidential: A Memoir of Love, Sex, and Addiction, autobiography
 Wolf's Empire: Gladiator, novel, co-written with Morgan Grant Buchanan, 2016

Discography
 Claudia Squared with Claudia Cummings (1996)
 Trying to Forget by The Be Five (1998)
 "Taboo" single (1998, Zard)
 Once upon a Time (2001, Zard)

References

External links

 Official Blog
 

 

Actresses from California
Actresses from Glendale, California
American film actresses
American people of German descent
American people of Irish descent
American television actresses
American video game actresses
American voice actresses
Living people
20th-century American actresses
21st-century American actresses
1965 births